Ross Wardle (born 28 April 1991) is a retired Welsh rugby union player. Wardle played primarily for the Newport Gwent Dragons regional team as a winger, as well as Bedwas RFC.

Wardle scored a try on his debut for Newport Gwent Dragons on 10 November 2012 versus Bath.

During the 2013–14 Pro12 season, Wardle was the Dragons top try scorer, touching down seven times. He suffered a serious knee injury near the end of the season.

After sustaining a knee injury in 2016, Wardle retired from professional rugby, taking up a career as a pharmacist. He later returned to the game with Bedwas, the side he began his career with.

References

External links 
 Bedwas profile
 Dragons profile

Welsh rugby union players
Dragons RFC players
Bedwas RFC players
Living people
1991 births
Rugby union players from Cardiff
Rugby union wings